KCWN (99.9 FM) is a commercial radio station that serves the area of Oskaloosa, Iowa, United States.  The station primarily broadcasts a Christian contemporary format. KCWN is licensed to Crown Broadcasting Company.

The transmitter and broadcast tower are located west of Oskaloosa.

References

External links

 KCWN website

CWN